The Carmel Weavers Studio, also known as Cottage of Sweets, was Ruth Kuster's weavers studio, that was in front of the Theatre of the Golden Bough in Carmel-by-the-Sea, California. Ruth Kuster was the wife of lawyer and theatrical producer Edward G. Kuster. The studio qualified for inclusion in the city's Downtown Historic District Property Survey, and was registered with the California Register of Historical Resources on January 27, 2003. The building is occupied by the Cottage of Sweets.

History

The Carmel Weavers Studio is a one-story, plaster and wood-framed Tudor Revival English cottage with a steep pitched side-gabled roof. Carmel stone flower planters are at the base of the building in front on Ocean Avenue and Monte Verde Street behind a Carmel stone court. The studio was built in September 1922 by Lee E. Gottfried for Ruth Kuster, the wife of lawyer and theatrical producer Edward G. Kuster. It housed her and two fellow local weavers, with their looms and spinning wheels. They made and sold woven scarves, hats, handbags, blankets, and other clothing articles.

In July 1923, the studio was rolled down on logs from Dolores Street to the Court of the Golden Bough on Ocean Avenue. In August 1923, Gottfried expanded the studio with a design by Kuster that included a brick fireplace and a ticket booth for the Theatre of the Golden Bough. At the same time, construction of Kuster's Seven Arts Shop was being planned as another shop for the courtyard. Kuster would have Gottfried build Sade's on the northeast side of the court in 1925.

The building qualifies for inclusion in the Downtown Historic District Property Survey because it is one of the early commercial shops designed and funded by theatrical producer and lawyer Edward G. Kuster, and was built to compliment the Golden Bough Theatre.

Carmel writer Daisy Bostick noted in an April 4, 1924 article for the Carmel Pine Cone that, "In Carmel-by-the-Sea, on Ocean avenue, there is a group of little shops that might well be transferred to an artist's canvas and labeled, A Bit of Old Europe."

In 1926, lawyer and author Tirey L. Ford wrote a book about  Monterey and talked about "A Bit Of Carmel," where he described Carmel's "Main Street," as: "A flavor of Italy is twisted into the wrought-iron sign swinging from the front of the Court of the Golden Bough, about which cluster some of the most interesting and lovely of the Carmel shops...The owner of the shops and theater which form the Court of the Golden Bough was a professional cellist, and formerly business manager of one of the largest symphony orchestras in the West.

In 1959, Walter "Wally" Cullomore, from British Columbia, Canada bought the shop and turned it into the Cottage of Sweets. In 1980, Lanny & Linda Rose took over the business and kept if for 39 years before selling it to Hans Hess and his family.

See also
 California Natural Resources Agency

References

External links

 Downtown Conservation District Historic Property Survey
 Office of Historic Preservation

1922 establishments in California
Carmel-by-the-Sea, California
Buildings and structures in Monterey County, California